Nnamdi Oduamadi Chidiebere (born 17 October 1990), also known by his shirt name Odu, is a Nigerian footballer who plays as a forward, currently under contract for Eccellenza club Colleferro.

Club career

Early career 
Born in Lagos, Oduamadi started playing football at the local Pepsi Football Academy at the age of 7. He left his home country in 2008 to join Milan, although he was officially signed only in January 2009 due to bureaucratic issues. Oduamadi spent two seasons in the club's youth system and was a member of the under-20 side who won the Coppa Italia Primavera in 2010, 25 years after the team's last success in the competition.

At the beginning of the 2010–11 season, Milan announced to have sold half of the rights to Oduamadi to Genoa in co-ownership for €3.5 million, as part of the deal that saw defender Sokratis Papastathopoulos move the other way. The Nigerian, though, stayed at Milan on loan, being included in the first team squad. He made his official debut for the club in a league game against Catania on 18 September 2010, coming off the bench in the last minutes. However, that remained his only appearance of the season and he still played games for the under-20 team at times through the season as an over-age player, being also included in the squad for the annual Viareggio Cup.

Torino 
At the beginning the 2011–12 season, Oduamadi's co-ownership deal between Milan and Genoa was resolved in favour of the former, but he was sent on loan to Serie B club Torino. He ended the season with 11 appearances and three goals.

Varese and Brescia 
For the 2012–13 season, Oduamadi joined Serie B side Varese on another loan deal.

At the start of the 2013–14 campaign, Oduamadi moved to Serie B club Brescia, once again on loan.

On 31 January 2014, Oduamadi rejoined Varese, making his second loan spell.

Crotone & Latina
On 8 August 2014, Oduamadi was signed by Serie B club Crotone. On 21 January 2015 he was signed by U.S. Latina Calcio.

Şanlıurfaspor and back to Milan
On 22 July 2015, Oduamadi moved on loan to TFF First League club Şanlıurfaspor for the season. However, the deal was cut short before the end of the summer transfer window and he came to Milan.

HJK Helsinki
On 22 March 2016, Oduamadi moved to Finnish club HJK Helsinki, on a loan deal set to expire on 31 December. On 26 May 2016, he scored the decisive goal in the Helsinki derby as HJK claimed a 2-1 victory over HIFK.

Back to Milan
In 2017–18 season, Oduamadi played for Milan Primavera team as an over-age player. He also received call-up from the first team.

Later career 
On 8 October 2021, Oduamadi signed for Serie D club Crema.

International career 
At international level, Oduamadi was first capped by Nigeria U-17, when he was at the Pepsi Football Academy. He went on to be called up by Nigeria U-20 to take part in the 2009 FIFA U-20 World Cup, but eventually was cut from the final squad due to an hamstring injury.

Oduamadi made his full international debut for Nigeria against Kenya, on 29 March 2011, featuring as a second-half substitute. Two years later, he made his second appearance against Kenya in a 2014 World Cup qualifying match, where he scored the equalising goal in the 94th minute to level the score.

Oduamadi was selected for Nigeria's squad at the 2013 FIFA Confederations Cup,
in which he scored three goals against Tahiti in their opening match.

Career statistics

Club

International

Statistics accurate as of match played 28 May 2014

International goals 
Scores and results list Nigeria's goal tally first.

Honours 
Milan
Serie A (1): 2010–11

See also 
 List of FIFA Confederations Cup goalscorers

References

External links 
 Profile at Assocalciatori.it 
 

Living people
1990 births
Association football forwards
Nigerian footballers
Nigerian expatriate footballers
Expatriate footballers in Italy
Expatriate footballers in Finland
Nigerian expatriate sportspeople in Italy
Serie A players
Serie B players
Veikkausliiga players
A.C. Milan players
Torino F.C. players
S.S.D. Varese Calcio players
Brescia Calcio players
Latina Calcio 1932 players
Helsingin Jalkapalloklubi players
Nigeria under-20 international footballers
Nigeria international footballers
2013 FIFA Confederations Cup players
Sportspeople from Lagos